Palo Alto is an unincorporated community in Highland County, Virginia, United States.

References

Unincorporated communities in Highland County, Virginia
Unincorporated communities in Virginia